Mersin Congress and Exhibition Center is a congress center is Mersin, Turkey. (also called Mersin Congress and Exhibition Palace)
It is situated at the north east corner of the Atatürk Park in Mersin. Constructed between 2005 and 2008, it is owned by Mersin municipality. The chief architect is Celal Abdi Güzer.

But with the pool, parking area and other open space facilities, the center covers a much wider area. There are three conference halls in the center, the biggest being a 1,000-seat hall.

References

2008 establishments in Turkey
Buildings and structures completed in 2008
Buildings and structures in Mersin
Convention centers in Turkey
Culture in Mersin
Music venues in Turkey
Tourist attractions in Mersin
21st-century architecture in Turkey